St. Anna was a Roman Catholic mission station during the German colonial period.  It contained a plantation of coconut palm and rubber trees for export to Europe.  It was located at Berlinhafen, Kaiser-Wilhelmsland (German New Guinea).

Sources 
Averberg, Theodor: Skizzen und Bilder aus der Südsee-Mission - 3. Ein Besuch auf der Missionsfarm St. Anna, Steyler Missionsbote, 1908; 35: 90–92. 
 Deutsches Kolonial-Lexikon (1920), Vol. III, p. 251

German New Guinea
Christian missions in Oceania
Catholic Church in Papua New Guinea